Betora (or Bethora) is a village in the Ponda taluka (sub-district) of Goa.  It is part of the Betora-Nirancal village panchayat (or village council) and is surrounded by Khandepar (or Candepar) and Kurti (or Curti) villages. This area is a predominantly agricultural area of Goa.

Area, population
According to the official 2011 Census, Betora in Ponda taluka has an area of 1,414.29 hectares, a total of 1,405 households, a population of 6,133 (comprising 3,240 males and 2,893 females) with an under-six population of 821 (comprising 412 boys and 409 girls).

Betora's location code number in the Census of India is 626859.

Location
Betora lies on the outskirts of Ponda town.  In its vicinity are Codar, Curdi, Candepar or Khandepar and Sidhanath Hill.  It is located about 5 km from Ponda town and 35 km from Panjim or Panaji.

Industrial estate
The Bethora Industrial Estate is run by the Goa Industrial Development Corporation (GIDC).  This centre has some 126 plots or sheds within its area, with sizes ranges from 20 square metres to 27,222 square metres (Crompton Greaves).  Among the units at this industrial estate are ones involved in the manufacture of furniture, glass designing, ceiling fans, LED bulbs, tower erection, MS grills, grills and gates, exhaust mufflers, separating agent (soap solution), acid slurry, steel furniture, plastic shutters, steel fabrication items, sheet metal components, fan components, pharma formulations, tipper bus body vehicles, bus body building, printing, nails, dies and moulds, tablets and ointments, laundry, fan assembly, stator winding assembling, solvent products, cashew nut shell liquid, fish net twines, corrugated boxes, powder coating, electroplating works, paper products, steel furniture, flour mills, ready-made garments, precast cement products, injection molded products, jerry-cans, and other products or services.

Tribal controversy
Around 2017, Bethora was in the news following a controversy over Waghmare tribals whom villagers wanted to disallow from living in the locality.

Panchayat
The village panchayat (council) of Bethora-Nirancal has nine members, and is classified as a "B" class panchayat.

References

Villages in North Goa district